The chess events at the 2011 All-Africa Games in Maputo, Mozambique were held on September 5–13, 2011.

Participating nations

Medal summary

Medals table

Notes

References
Wojciech Bartelski. 10th All-Africa Games (chess - men): Maputo 2011. OlimpBase.
Wojciech Bartelski. 10th All-Africa Games (chess - women): Maputo 2011. OlimpBase.
Dr. Daaim Shabazz. 10th All-Africa Games (Maputo, Mozambique). The Chess Drum.

2011 All-Africa Games
2011
African Games